Preslav Nakov (born on 26 January 1977 in Veliko Turnovo, Bulgaria) is a computer scientist who works on natural language processing. He is particularly known for his research on fake news detection, automatic detection of offensive language, and biomedical text mining. Nakov obtained a PhD in computer science under the supervision of Marti Hearst from the University of California, Berkeley. He was the first person to receive the prestigious John Atanasov Presidential Award for achievements in the development of the information society by the President of Bulgaria.

Education 
Preslav Nakov grew up in Veliko Turnovo, Bulgaria, where he attended primary and secondary school, obtaining a Diploma in Mathematics from the Secondary School of Mathematics and Natural Sciences 'Vassil Drumev' in 1996. He then obtained a MSc degree in Informatics (Computer Science) with specialisations in Artificial Intelligence and Information and Communication Technologies from Sofia University in 2011. During his MSc studies, he worked as a teaching assistant at Sofa University and the Bulgarian Academy of Sciences, as well as a guest lecturer at University College London during a visit in Spring 1999. Subsequently, he enrolled into the PhD program at the Department of Electrical Engineering and Computer Science, University of California, Berkeley, partly supported by a Fulbright Scholarship. Under the supervision of Marti Hearst, he wrote a thesis on the topic of text mining from the Web, and graduated with a PhD in Computer Science from UC Berkeley in 2007.

Career 
Upon graduating from the University of California, Berkeley, Nakov started work as a Research Fellow at the National University of Singapore. Since 2012, he has been a Senior Scientist at the Qatar Computing Research Institute (QCRI). He maintains a position as an honorary lecturer at Sofia University.

Research 
Preslav Nakov works in the area of natural language processing and text mining. He has published over 300 peer-reviewed research papers.
Preslav Nakov's early research was on lexical semantics and text mining. He published influential papers on biomedical text mining, most prominently on methods to identify citation sentences in biomedical papers.
He is though most well-known for his research on fake news detection, such as his work on predicting the factuality and bias of news sources, as well as for his research on the automatic detection of offensive language. Nakov also previously led the organisation of a popular evaluation campaign on sentiment analysis systems as part of SemEval between the years of 2015 and 2017.
He currently coordinates the Tanbih News Aggregator project, a large project with partners at the Qatar Computing Research Institute and the MIT Computer Science and Artificial Intelligence Laboratory, which aims to uncover stance, bias and propaganda in news.

Selected honors and distinctions 
2003 John Atanasov Presidential Award for achievements in the development of the information society
2011 RANLP 2011 Young Researcher Award
2020 Conference on Information and Knowledge Management, best paper award

References 

1977 births
Living people
Computer scientists
Natural language processing researchers
University of California, Berkeley alumni
Data miners
People from Veliko Tarnovo
Sofia University alumni